The Love Hotel is a 1933 German comedy film directed by Carl Lamac and starring Anny Ondra, Mathias Wieman and Peter Voß. It was shot at the Bavaria Studios in Munich. The film's sets were designed by the art directors Wilhelm Depenau and Erich Zander. A separate French-language version was also made.

Cast

References

Bibliography

External links 
 

1933 films
Films of the Weimar Republic
German comedy films
1933 comedy films
1930s German-language films
Films directed by Karel Lamač
German multilingual films
German black-and-white films
1930s German films
Films shot at Bavaria Studios
Bavaria Film films